The Bill Ritchie Handicap is an Australian Turf Club Group 3 Thoroughbred open quality handicap horse race for horses three years old and older, over a distance of 1400 metres, held annually at Randwick Racecourse, Sydney, Australia in September. Total prize money for the race is A$200,000.

History
Originally the race was known as the AJC Squatters' Handicap, which was run as early as 1867. The race was renamed in 1994 after the New South Wales racehorse owner-breeder Bill Ritchie.

Venue
 1980–1990 - Rosehill Gardens Racecourse
 2002–2003 - Randwick Racecourse
 2005–2010 - Warwick Farm Racecourse 
 2011 - Rosehill Gardens Racecourse
 2012 onwards - Randwick Racecourse

Grade
 1979–1997 - Listed Race
 1998 onwards - Group 3

Winners

 2022 - Top Ranked 
 2021 - Atishu 
 2020 - Probabeel 
 2019 - Kolding 
 2018 - Siege Of Quebec 
 2017 - Comin' Through
 2016 - Sons Of John
 2015 - Sadler's Lake
 2014 - Manawanui
 2013 - Boban
 2012 - Steps In Time
 2011 - Thankgodyourehere
 2010 - Drumbeats
 2009 - McClintock
 2008 - Judged
 2007 - †race not held
 2006 - Coalesce
 2005 - Flaming
 2004 - Osca Warrior
 2003 - Zabarra
 2002 - Zabarra
 2001 - Fouardee
 2000 - Landsighting
 1999 - Brave Prince
 1998 - Bezeal Bay
 1997 - Holy Roller
 1996 - Mamzelle Pedrille
 1995 - Monopolize
 1994 - Rouslan
 1993 - Belas Knap
 1992 - Prince Of Praise
 1991 - Rechabite 
 1990 - Our Poverty Bay
 1989 - Royal Reel
 1988 - Pleasant Flight
 1987 - Royal Reel
 1986 - Full Page
 1985 - Dinky Flyer
 1984 - Muffler
 1983 - Leica Planet
 1982 - Note Of Victory
 1981 - Gooree Pride
 1980 - Tulip Town
 1979 - Drummer
 1978 - Go Mod

† Not held because of outbreak of equine influenza

See also
 List of Australian Group races
 Group races

References

Horse races in Australia